Procne (Próknē ) or Progne is a minor figure in Greek mythology. She was an Athenian princess as the elder daughter of a king of Athens named Pandion. Procne was married to the king of Thrace, Tereus, who instead lusted after her sister Philomela. Tereus forced himself on Philomela and locked her away. When Procne disovered her sister and her gruesome fate, she took revenge against her husband by murdering their only child, a young boy named Itys. Procne's story serves as an origin myth for the nightingale.

Family 
Procne's mother was the naiad Zeuxippe and her siblings were Philomela, Erechtheus, Butes and possibly Teuthras. She married King Tereus of Thrace and became the mother of Itys (Itylos).

Mythology 

Procne was given to wife to Tereus, a king of Thrace, in some versions because he assisted king Pandion in a war against the Laconians, so Pandion gave him a daughter in marriage. During their marriage, she bore him a son named Itys. As years passed, Procne began to feel homesick, and asked her husband to fetch her her younger sister Philomela, so Tereus travelled to Athens in order to escort Philomela to her sister. Pandion was unsuspecting and Philomela excited, Tereus however conceived a great passion for the beautiful Philomela, which only grew and grew during the journey back home. In one version, Tereus lied about Procne having died, and asked Pandion for Philomela's hand in marriage. When they reached the shore, he dragged her into the woods (and, as Ovid introduced, a cabin) and raped her in spite of her protests and pleading. Philomela then threatened to tell everyone, so he in fear cut her tongue off, and put guards to prevent her from escaping. He then returned to Procne claiming that Philomela had passed away during the journey; Procne greatly mourned her sister.

Time passed, and soon a Thracian festival in honour to Dionysus was held, during which it was customary for Thracian women to gather gifts and send them to their queen. Philomela, unable to speak or leave, wove in letters in her tapestry, or a gown, that spoke of her fate at the hands of Tereus. Once Procne got hands on her tapestry, she disguised herself, joined the festivities with the other women, and located the cabin in which Philomela was kept captive. She broke in, snatched her sister, dressed her instead in the bacchic attire, and brought her into Tereus's palace.

Although Philomela was unable to fully inform Procne of her woes, Procne promised her sister to avenge the great injustice done to her. As she was pondering on a fitting way to enact revenge, her young son Itys entered the chamber in search of his mother. Procne, wanting revenge against Tereus and seeing their son as nothing but an extension of his father, slew him and cooked him. Then she invited Tereus for dinner, with the excuse that according to an Athenian custom, the wife had to prepare dinner for her husband away from everyone else. Tereus ate his son, and when he asked where the child was, the two women presented him with the head of Itys.

Tereus eats by himself, seated in his tall ancestral chair, and fills his belly with his own child. And in the darkness of his understanding cries ‘Fetch Ithys here’. Procne cannot hide her cruel exultation, and now, eager to be, herself, the messenger of destruction, she cries ‘You have him there, inside, the one you ask for.’ He looks around and questions where the boy is. And then while he is calling out and seeking him, Philomela, springs forward, her hair wet with the dew of that frenzied murder, and hurls the bloodstained head of Itys in his father’s face. Nor was there a time when she wished more strongly to have the power of speech, and to declare her exultation in fitting words.

Enraged, Tereus grabbed his sword and began to hunt down his wife and her sister with the intention to kill them. The two women ran, but he caught up to them in Daulia, in Phocis, for which they were later called 'ladies of Daulia'. The gods, taking notice, transformed them all into birds. Tereus became a hoopoe, and the women into a nightingale and a swallow. While Greek sources traditionally held that Procne became the singing nightingale and Philomela the silent swallow, Roman authors tended to swap the birds, so that Procne became the swallow, and Philomela the nightingale. This pattern is only broken by a Hellenistic Greek writer named Agatharchides, who refers to Philomela as a nightingale. A late antiquity scholiast, Pseudo-Nonnus, names Zeus specifically as the god who put and end to the chase by transforming them all into birds. As a bird, Procne continued to mourn the death of her child for all time.

Variations and origins 
Eustathius of Thessalonica swapped the roles of the two sisters, so that Procne was the unmarried woman who was raped and mutilated by Tereus. One author has Tereus succeed in murdering both Procne and Philomela before they are all transformed into birds, but hoopoes continued to chase swallows and nightingales.

A more or less identical tale is said of Aedon ("nightingale", supplanting Procne), Chelidon ("swallow", supplanting Philomela) and Polytechnus (supplanting Tereus); in this version, which takes place in Asia Minor rather than Thrace, Polytechnus loses a bet against his wife and has to find her a female slave, so he rapes (but does not maim) her sister Chelidon. Once Chelidon reveals to Aedon what has happened, the myth proceeds as above, with the difference that the two women manage to reach their father (here Pandareus) who has his servants beat and tie up Polytechnus, who is then smeared with honey and left to the mercy of insects. Aedon, in pity, removes the flies, enraging her family. As they try to attack her, the gods intervene and change them all into birds (Aedon and Chelidon as usual, but Polytechnus becomes a woodpecker, Pandareus a sea-eagle, the mother a kingfisher, the brother a hoopoe).

The first traces of the myth come early, as both Hesiod and Sappho refer to the swallow as Pandionis, or "daughter of Pandion". Homer also mentions Aedon the daughter of Pandion who killed her son Itylus, however the context of this version differs greatly, and the name of her husband is given as Zethus, the king of Thebes.

One of the earliest full accounts was given by Sophocles, in his now lost play Tereus, of which only brief fragments and a synopsis remain as means for reconstruction. According to Fitzpatrick, the play apparently began with Tereus arriving in Thrace and lying to Procne about Philomela being dead, while bringing with him a female slave, who is in truth Philomela in forced disguise. Procne would have a soliloquy where she laments her isolation and the social position of married women, and in particular her position as a Greek woman married to a barbarian (a foreigner), before discovering the truth thanks to the tapestry. The recognition of Philomela would have taken place on stage, followed by Procne's gruesome revenge and Tereus's realization of his own cannibalism. A messenger then would announce the transformation of the three into birds by a deus-ex-machina, who in this play it most likely was Apollo.

Jennifer Marsh has argued that Sophocles was inspired by Euripides's play Medea, a work where a woman murders her children in order to enact revenge against her husband, and subsequently it was him who introduced the element of infanticide and child-eating in Procne's story. The chorus from Medea claim to know only one other woman who killed her child besides Medea herself, Ino, apparently knowing nothing of Procne. The reverse however, that Euripides was inspired by Sophocles's portrayal of Procne for his depiction of Medea, could also be true. At the same time, it is also possible that the pedophagy was part of the earlier telling Sophocles used as source, and rather it is the Thracian setting that is a Sophoclean addition. However, the rape and the mutilation of Philomela does not have a clear precedent before Sophocles. Earlier than Sophocles, a seventh century BC metope from a temple of Apollo seem to attest to the notion of the nightingale and the swallow being partners of Itys/Itylus's murder, with Aedon/Procne as the main culprit. Some vases, although much less certainly, might depict the scene of the murder.

Legacy 
The swallow genera Progne, Ptyonoprogne and Psalidoprocne and the treeswift family Hemiprocnidae derive their names from the myth of this Thracian queen.

See also 

 Gudrun
 Titus Andronicus

Footnotes

References

Bibliography 
 Antoninus Liberalis, The Metamorphoses of Antoninus Liberalis translated by Francis Celoria (Routledge 1992). Online version at the Topos Text Project.
 Apollodorus, The Library with an English Translation by Sir James George Frazer, F.B.A., F.R.S. in 2 Volumes, Cambridge, MA, Harvard University Press; London, William Heinemann Ltd. 1921. ISBN 0-674-99135-4. Online version at the Perseus Digital Library. Greek text available from the same website.
 
 
 
 
 Maurus Servius Honoratus, In Vergilii carmina comentarii. Servii Grammatici qui feruntur in Vergilii carmina commentarii; recensuerunt Georgius Thilo et Hermannus Hagen. Georgius Thilo. Leipzig. B. G. Teubner. 1881. Online version at the Perseus Digital Library.
 
 
 Publius Ovidius Naso, Metamorphoses. Hugo Magnus. Gotha (Germany). Friedr. Andr. Perthes. 1892. Latin text available at the Perseus Digital Library.
 
 Stephanus of Byzantium, Stephani Byzantii Ethnicorum quae supersunt, edited by August Meineike (1790-1870), published 1849. A few entries from this important ancient handbook of place names have been translated by Brady Kiesling. Online version at the Topos Text Project.

External links 

 

Princesses in Greek mythology
Queens in Greek mythology
Metamorphoses into birds in Greek mythology
Attican characters in Greek mythology
Legendary birds
Attic mythology
Deeds of Zeus
Deeds of Apollo